"The Old Fashioned Way" is the English version of Charles Aznavour's Les plaisirs démodés song. The song was released in 1973 by Barclay Records as a single (What makes a Man on the B-side) and became a hit in the Netherlands (No. 5), Belgium and in the UK (it was on British charts for 15 weeks).

Other performers
Fred Astaire
Mantovani Orchestra
Petula Clark
Frank Sinatra
Shirley Bassey
Helen Reddy
Liberace

As a film soundtrack
Eyes Wide Shut (1999) (performed by Victor Silvester Orchestra)
Jake Spanner, Private Eye (1989) (TV)
The Muppet Show, Episode #1.9 (1976)
Ten Little Indians (1974)

Discography
 40 chansons d'or

References

External links
Aznavour at IMDB
charles-aznavour/greatest-golden-hits/ Greatest Golden Hits by Charles Aznavour on MSN Music

Charles Aznavour songs
1973 songs
Shirley Bassey songs
Songs written by Charles Aznavour